Pasherienptah (III) (p3-šrỉ-n-ptḥ, 'Son of Ptah'; November 4, 90 BCE – July 13 or 14, 41 BCE) was an ancient Egyptian high Priest of Ptah in Memphis from 76 BCE until his death. Two of his stelas are known, the one with a hieroglyphic inscription is in the Ashmolean Museum (Ash. M. 1971/18), the other, Demotic stela, of which only seven fragments have been found, is in the British Museum (BM 886).

Background

Born as the son of High Priest Pedubast III and the sistrum-player of Ptah, Herankh-Beludje in the 25th regnal year of Ptolemy X. He became High Priest at the age of fourteen and played an important role at the Sed festival of the king. It is also known that he made a visit to Alexandria, where he participated in a ritual honoring the goddess Isis. His autobiography also mentions a visit of the king to Memphis. At the age of 31, on July 25, 58 BCE he married fourteen-year-old Taimhotep, the member of a priestly family, and had three daughters in succession, Berenike (56/55–33 BCE), Herankh-Beludje, and Her'an-Tapedubast. They prayed to Imhotep – an Old Kingdom sage who was later deified and associated with Ptah – for a son. Their son Imhotep-Pedubast was born in 46 BCE, as Pasherienptah's fifth child. Another daughter, Kheredankh (65–44 BCE), was from a previous relationship.

Pasherienptah died at the age of 49, surviving his wife by one year, and was buried in the 12th regnal year of Cleopatra VII, on October 1, 41 BCE. His son followed him as high priest, but he died young, in 30 BCE and had no descendants.

References

External links
 Epitaph of Psherenptah 

Memphis High Priests of Ptah
90 BC births
41 BC deaths